Arrowroot tea, also called kudzu tea, is a traditional East Asian tea made from East Asian arrowroot, a type of kudzu.

Names 
Arrowroot tea is called gegen-cha in Chinese, kuzuyu in Japanese, and chikcha, galgeun-cha, and galbun-cha in Korean.

Preparation

Japan 
Kuzuyu (葛湯) is a sweet Japanese beverage that is made by adding kudzu flour to hot water. It has a thick, honey-like texture, and a pale, translucent appearance. It is served in a mug or tea bowl. During the winter, Kuzuyu is traditionally served for dessert as a hot drink. 

In Japanese, Kuzu (葛) is the word for "kudzu". It is also translated as "arrowroot",  although kudzu and arrowroot are distinct plants. Yu (湯) means "hot water". In English, the name of the drink is sometimes translated as kudzu starch gruel or arrowroot tea.

In order to make Kuzuyu, Kudzu flour is added to hot water and stirred until thick. Kudzu flour, or Kuzuko (葛粉), is a powder that is made from the dried root of the kudzu plant. Kudzu flour can also be used in East Asian sauces and soups, as it is a powerful thickening agent. When added to hot water, it quickly alters the water's texture. Though lacking fragrance and taste in its powder form, the arrowroot takes on a unique sweet flavor when dissolved in the hot water.

Korea 
Chikcha ("arrowroot tea") can be made with either sliced East Asian arrowroot or the starch powder made from the root. Chick is the native Korean name of the plant, while cha means "tea". Chikcha can also refer to the tea made from arrowroot flower. Chikcha made from powdered arrowroot is also called galbun-cha. Galbun-cha is a Sino-Korean name for the drink, formed from gal (: the Korean pronunciation of the Chinese word for kudzu) and bun (: the Korean pronunciation of the Chinese word for "flour, powder"). Conversely, chikcha made by boiling the dried roots is called galgeun-cha, with geun meaning "root".

The roots are harvested from late autumn to early spring. They are then washed, peeled, and sun-dried. Jujubes can also be boiled with the shredded roots if desired. The tea can be served hot or cold. While honey may be added to taste, sugar is not recommended.

An alternative tea can be made by ground arrowroot. First, the roots are torn into thin shreds. They are then dried for twenty days in shade, followed by ten days in a hot ondol room, after which they are ground to a starch powder. Tea is then made by mixing the starch powder with hot water. The gruel-like tea that results can also be combined with sugar, milk, green tea, or cocoa. Similar tea can also be made using starch powder from the scaly bulbs of Asian fawnlily.

See also 
 Cinnamon tea
 Kelp tea
 Ginger tea
 Ginseng tea
 Traditional Korean tea
 Traditional Chinese tea
 Traditional Japanese tea

References 

Herbal tea
Japanese drinks
Korean tea
Chinese tea